The men's high jump event at the 1999 Pan American Games was held on July 30. Javier Sotomayor of Cuba had originally won the competition with a 2.30 metres jump but later tested positive for an illegal substance, cocaine, and was stripped of his medal.

Results

References

Athletics at the 1999 Pan American Games
1999